The New York Comic Con is an annual New York City fan convention dedicated to Western comics, graphic novels, anime, manga, video games, cosplay, toys, movies, and television. It was first held in 2006.

History
The New York Comic Con is a for-profit event produced and managed by ReedPop, a division of Reed Exhibitions and Reed Elsevier, and is not affiliated with the long running non-profit San Diego Comic-Con, nor the Big Apple Convention, later known as the Big Apple Comic-Con, owned by Wizard Entertainment. ReedPop is involved with other events, including Chicago Comic & Entertainment Expo (C2E2) and PAX Dev/PAX East/PAX Prime. ReedPop and New York Comic Con were founded by Greg Topalian, former senior vice president of Reed Exhibitions.

The first con was held in 2006 at the Jacob K. Javits Convention Center. Due to Reed Exhibitions' lack of experience with comic conventions (they primarily dealt with professional trade shows prior to 2006), attendance was far more than anticipated, and the main exhibition hall could only hold 10,000. Despite crowding on Friday afternoon, tickets continued to be sold due to low pre-reg numbers (4,500), and the non-counting of professionals and exhibitors. The main exhibition hall hit capacity Saturday morning and was locked by the fire marshals until people left, with the lockdown ending in the afternoon. Major guests, including Kevin Smith and Frank Miller, could not enter the main hall. The line to enter the convention wrapped around the building with waits of two hours to enter, and many were turned away. Ticket sales for Sunday were suspended. Reed announced that additional space would be acquired for the 2007 show.

The second con was held in 2007, with the convention organizer booking double the floor space than the previous year's space, and moving to the upper level of the Javits Center. The show on Friday was again only open to industry and press until 4 p.m., when it opened to the public. Due to better planning, advance ticket sales were controlled, and the convention sold out for Saturday. Lines started forming at midnight Saturday to enter the convention, and by Saturday morning, there was a 2-hour wait in 20 degree temperatures to enter. Crowding was a problem in the Artists Alley, which was off the main convention floor, causing it to be moved to the main floor for 2008. The American Anime Awards, hosted by New York Comic Con, was held on February 24 at the New Yorker Hotel, during the Comic Con.

The third con held in 2008 moved to April, continued to grow (expanding space by 50%), and occupied most of the main level in the Javits Center. Stan Lee was awarded the inaugural New York Comics Legend Award at the Times Square Virgin Megastore before the Comic Con. Kids' Day programming was added to the convention on Sunday with the help of Kids's Comic Con. The fourth con held in 2009 returned to February and featured a charity art auction to support The Hero Initiative.

Due to scheduling conflicts with the Javits Center for spring dates and the creation of the Chicago Comic & Entertainment Expo by Reed, New York Comic Con was moved to October for Halloween starting in 2010. The New York Anime Festival, previously a separate event created by Reed, was also merged into Comic Con. Registration for the combined events was 190 percent ahead of 2009's numbers, convention space was increased by an additional 40 percent, and the anime festival was moved to the lower level of the Javits. The main floor of the convention center was split by a large construction area due to repairs to the Javits Center.

Intel Extreme Masters Global Challenge – New York took place in Comic Con 2011. It featured esports tournaments for games such as StarCraft II, League of Legends, and Counter-Strike.

In 2011, the convention was expanded to four days. The first day of the convention was initially limited to press, professionals, and fans that purchased a four-day pass. This changed in 2013, when single day Thursday passes were put on sale for the first time. With this addition, attendance at New York Comic Con grew to over 151,000, surpassing SDCC to become the largest comic convention in North America. The latter was unable to grow further due to venue capacity limits and an attendance cap of 130,000.

In 2016, it was announced that everyone attending NYCC 2016 would be required to complete a "Fan Verification" profile. The event organizers explained that this step was implemented in an attempt to reduce the number of scalpers and resellers who purchase tickets. Fan Verification would only be open from May 20 - June 14, and tickets purchased could only be assigned to someone with a profile. It was also announced that NYCC would no longer be selling VIP tickets, and that show tickets would not be sold at any retailers or events leading up to NYCC 2016.

In 2017, the sale of 3-day and 4-day passes to the event were discontinued. Only single day Thursday, Friday, Saturday, Sunday, and Sunday kids tickets would be sold for the event.

In 2018, the event organizers announced a partnership with Anime Expo for show called Anime Fest @ NYCC X Anime Expo.

The convention's 2020 show was originally scheduled for October 8–11. However, in August, the event's organizers announced the cancellation of their in-person event, due to the COVID-19 pandemic. Instead, a virtual event called "New York Comic Con X MCM Comic Con Metaverse" was on those dates. Tickets to the 2020 in-person event had not gone on sale prior to its cancellation.

New York Comic Con returned to the Javits Center in 2021 with an in-person event held on October 7-10. All attendees over the age of 12 were required to show proof of vaccination, and children under 12 had to show a negative coronavirus test result.

Location and dates

New York Anime Festival

The New York Anime Festival was an anime and manga convention held annually from 2007 to 2011 at the Jacob K. Javits Convention Center on the West Side of Manhattan in New York City. Produced by Reed Exhibitions, the people behind New York Comic Con, the inaugural event was held from December 7 through December 9, 2007. Starting in 2010 the New York Anime Festival has been held with the New York Comic Con, bringing the two cultures together. In 2012, the New York Anime festival was absorbed into Comic Con.

Event history

Eastern Championships of Cosplay
The Eastern Championships of Cosplay have been held at New York Comic Con since 2014. They are one of the stops in ReedPop's global Crown Championships of Cosplay circuit. The top three winning cosplayers receive cash prizes and the overall winner, the Eastern Champion, is entered into the final held at Chicago Comic & Entertainment Expo. Costumes are judged in four skill categories and then in an overall category. The skill categories are:
Needlework
Armor
FX (including animatronics, prosthetics, and other effects)
Larger than Life

Winners

Gallery

See also
Big Apple Comic Con
Oz Comic Con
Comic Art Convention
Phil Seuling

References

External links

New York Comic Con website
Official Mobile App
New York Anime Festival website
ReedPOP

Comics conventions in the United States
Multigenre conventions
October events
Festivals in New York City
Annual events in New York City
Recurring events established in 2006
2006 establishments in New York City
Culture of Manhattan
Conventions in New York City